Mycetophila formosa is a Palearctic species of  'fungus gnat' in the family Mycetophilidae. Mycetophila formosa is found in forest or wooded areas where the larvae develop in Phlebia radiata and moist, strongly decayed wood of birch and spruce log bearing Trechispora hymenocystis.

References

External links
Images representing  Mycetophila  at BOLD

Mycetophilidae